Carl Banas (born January 23, 1929) is a Toronto-born retired radio personality and actor. He is best known for his voice roles in Rudolph the Red-Nosed Reindeer (1964) and The Raccoons: Let’s Dance! (1985). As a television actor, he appeared in the series Wojeck as police detective Byron James, and provided voices for numerous TV series and features. He was also known as a radio personality on Toronto radio station CKFM-FM, later and more famously known as MIX 99.9, (currently known as Virgin Radio 999) in the 1970s and 1980s. He mainly hosted weekday evenings, and was known for his deep voice, smooth manner and vignettes about Toronto featured during his show. 

In 1987 he moved to CJEZ 97.3 "Easy 97" (later known as 97.3 EZ Rock and currently as "Boom 97.3") where he continued hosting weekday evenings until he left the station and retired from radio.

Personal life 
Banas performed live readings of Dickens' A Christmas Carol every year before Christmas, utilizing his voice skills to play multiple characters. One such performance was recorded and published by Polydor Records under the title Charles Dickens' A Christmas Carol and Other Yuletide Favorites. 

Banas is the last surviving cast member from Spider-Man, and as of 2023, he is one of the last two surviving cast members of the 1964 Rudolph the Red-Nosed Reindeer special, along with Corinne Conley.

Filmography

Film

Television

Music videos

References

External links
 
 Rock Radio Scrapbook.ca

Living people
Male actors from Toronto
Canadian radio hosts
Canadian male voice actors
Canadian male television actors
Canadian male film actors
1929 births